Gray Butte Field Airport is a private airport located 25 miles east of Palmdale, California.  It is owned by General Atomics of San Diego.  Its primary use is the development and testing of Unmanned Aerial Vehicles (UAV) for the United States Military and the United States Government.

Grey Butte Field Airport, has a sister site located at El Mirage Field.

Aircraft known to have been operated and developed at this facility include:
 General Atomics Avenger
 General Atomics MQ-9 Reaper
 Predator B
 Predator XP
 Gray Eagle
 Gray Eagle Extended Range (GE-ER)
 MQ-9B

History 

During World War II, the airport was designated as Gray Butte Auxiliary Airfield (No 4), and was an auxiliary training airfield for Victorville Army Airfield, California.

The wartime runways are abandoned and now used by General Atomics for their UAV testing.

The airfield was assigned the FAA location identifier GVM, but on July 26, 2012, the airport's location identifier was changed to 04CA..

See also

 California World War II Army Airfields

References 

  Abandoned & Little-Known Airfields: California - Southern Palmdale area

Airports in Los Angeles County, California
Airports in San Bernardino County, California